Conception is an unincorporated community in Highland Township, Wabasha County, Minnesota, United States.

The community is located near the junction of Wabasha County Roads 14 and 18.

Nearby places include Wabasha, Kellogg, Theilman, and Plainview.  The community is located within the Richard J. Dorer Memorial Hardwood State Forest.

The community was named for the Catholic church, the Church of the Immaculate Conception, which was built in 1866 in section 10 of Highland Township.

References

Unincorporated communities in Minnesota
Unincorporated communities in Wabasha County, Minnesota
Rochester metropolitan area, Minnesota